Heinrich Gottfried von Bretschneider (1739 in Gera – 1810) was a German satirical writer. Bretschneider led a bohemian life, served in the army, and held various political posts. Later he was bibliothecary at Lemberg. He was closely linked to the writers of the enlightenment, especially Friedrich Nicolai. Bretschneider composed, besides satirical writings, Almanach der Heiligen auf das Jahr, 1788, Wallers Leben und Sitten, and the comic epic, Graf Esau.

Literature 

 Anton Peter Petri: Biographisches Lexikon des Banater Deutschtums, Marquartstein, 1992,

References

External links
Eine entsetzliche Mordgeschichte von dem jungen Werther (poem in German)

1739 births
1810 deaths
People from Reuss
German male writers
German librarians